The Canton of Olargues is a former subdivision of the French department of Hérault, and its subdivision, the Arrondissement of Béziers. It had 4,416 inhabitants (2012). It was disbanded following the French canton reorganisation which came into effect in March 2015. It consisted of 13 communes, which joined the canton of Saint-Pons-de-Thomières in 2015.

Municipalities
The canton comprised the following communes:

 Berlou
 Cambon-et-Salvergues
 Colombières-sur-Orb
 Ferrières-Poussarou
 Mons
 Olargues
 Prémian
 Roquebrun
 Saint-Étienne-d'Albagnan
 Saint-Julien
 Saint-Martin-de-l'Arçon
 Saint-Vincent-d'Olargues
 Vieussan

References

Olargues
2015 disestablishments in France
States and territories disestablished in 2015